The 2012 Fagiano Okayama season saw Fagiano Okayama compete in J.League Division 2 for the fourth consecutive season. Fagiano Okayama also competed in the 2012 Emperor's Cup.

Players

Competitions

J. League

League table

Matches

Emperor's Cup

References

Fagiano Okayama
Fagiano Okayama seasons